Éric Dubus (born 28 February 1966 in Pézenas, Hérault) is a former French middle-distance runner, who became European Indoor Champion over 3000 metres in 1990, and was the silver medalist over 3000 m at the 1993 IAAF World Indoor Championships. Dubus finished fourth over 1500 metres at the 1994 European Athletics Championships in Helsinki.

Competition record

References

External links

 European Championships

1966 births
Living people
People from Pézenas
French male middle-distance runners
Olympic athletes of France
Athletes (track and field) at the 1996 Summer Olympics
World Athletics Championships athletes for France
Sportspeople from Hérault